My World may refer to:

Music

Albums
My World (Bryn Christopher album), 2008
My World (Cyndi Thomson album), 2001
My World (Dyland & Lenny album), 2010
My World (Emilia Rydberg album), 2009
My World (Ray Charles album), 1993
My World (Ron Artest album), 2006
My World (EP), a 2009 EP by Justin Bieber
Avril Lavigne: My World, a DVD by Avril Lavigne
My World, a 1998 album by Angela Gheorghiu
My World, a 1965 album by Eddy Arnold
My World, a 1997 album by Trout Fishing in America
My World, English-language title of the 1995 album Mi Mundo by Marta Sánchez

Songs
"My World" (Another Bad Creation song), 1991
"My World" (Avril Lavigne song), 2002
"My World" (Bee Gees song), 1972
"My World" (Guns N' Roses song), 1991
"My World" (Sick Puppies song), 2007
"My World", by Secret Affair ( 1980)
"My World", by SR-71 from Tomorrow (2001)
"My World", by Sublime with Rome from Yours Truly (2011)
"My World", by Tech N9ne featuring Brotha Lynch Hung & Dalima, from Everready (The Religion) (2006)
"My World", by 3 Doors Down from Seventeen Days (2005)
"My World", by Iggy Azalea from Ignorant Art (2011)
"My World", by Paul van Dyk from Global (2003)
"My World", by Asian Kung-Fu Generation from Sol-fa (2004)
"My World", by Metallica from St. Anger (2004)
"My World", by Emigrate from Emigrate (2007)

Tours 
My World Tour, the 2010 concert tour by Justin Bieber

Other uses
My World (book), a children's book by Margaret Wise Brown

See also
My World, My Way (disambiguation)
Mi Mundo (disambiguation)